Poco: The Songs of Richie Furay is a compilation album consisting of songs by Richie Furay during his tenure with the band Poco, released in 1980.

Track listing
All songs by Richie Furay
"A Good Feelin' To Know" – 5:15
"Hurry Up" – 4:06
"Don't Let It Pass By" – 2:33
"What If I Should Say I Love You" – 3:37
"Pickin' Up the Pieces" – 3:20
"Crazy Eyes" – 9:39
"And Settlin' Down" – 3:41
"C'mon [Live]"  – 3:10
"What Am I Gonna Do" – 3:46

Personnel
Jim Messina - guitar, vocals
Richie Furay - guitar, 12-string guitar, vocals
Rusty Young - steel guitar, banjo, dobro, guitar, piano
Randy Meisner - bass, guitar, vocals
George Grantham - drums, vocals
Timothy B. Schmit - bass, vocals
Paul Cotton - guitar, vocals

References

Poco compilation albums
1980 compilation albums
Epic Records compilation albums